Besant may refer to:

 Besant (surname)
 Besant, Saskatchewan
 Besant Nagar, area of Chennai

See also
 Bezant, coin